Revolution is a documentary film by Jack O'Connell made in San Francisco in 1967. It was subsequently revived with added reminiscences.

Although most interviewees are not named some of them have been identified, such as Kurt Hirschhorn, Frank Jordan, Cecil Williams and Herb Caen. Daria Halprin appears in the film as herself. Also appearing in the film are the Ace of Cups, Country Joe and the Fish, and Dan Hicks.

Soundtrack
The soundtrack album features Steve Miller Band, Quicksilver Messenger Service, and Mother Earth who also appear in the film. It was released in 1968 by United Artists Records (UAS 5185) and produced by Ben Shapiro.

Track listing

See also
List of American films of 1968

References

External links
 

1968 films
Hippie films
American documentary films
1968 documentary films
Documentary films about San Francisco
Films set in 1967
1960s English-language films
1960s American films
English-language documentary films